Plum Alley is a rewards-based crowdfunding platform for female entrepreneurs. It was founded by Deborah Jackson in 2012. Plum Alley began as an e-commerce site.

Notes

External links

Crowdfunding platforms of the United States